Fabian Barański (born 27 May 1999) is a Polish rower.

He won a medal at the 2019 World Rowing Championships.

References

External links

1999 births
Living people
Polish male rowers
World Rowing Championships medalists for Poland
European Rowing Championships medalists
Olympic rowers of Poland
Rowers at the 2020 Summer Olympics
21st-century Polish people